In particle physics, the X charge (or simply X) is a conserved quantum number associated with the SO(10) grand unification theory. It is thought to be conserved in strong, weak, electromagnetic, gravitational, and Higgs interactions. Because the X charge is related to the weak hypercharge, it varies depending on the helicity of a particle. For example, a left-handed quark has an X charge of +1, whereas a right-handed quark can have either an X charge of −1 (for up, charm and top quarks), or −3 (for down, strange and bottom quarks).

 is related to the difference between the baryon number  and the lepton number  (that is  − ),  and the weak hypercharge W via the relation: 
.

X charge in proton decay 
Proton decay is a hypothetical form of radioactive decay, predicted by many grand unification theories. During proton decay, the common baryonic proton decays into lighter subatomic particles. However, proton decay has never been experimentally observed and is predicted to be mediated by hypothetical X and Y bosons. Many protonic decay modes have been predicted, one of which is shown below:
p+ → e + 

This form of decay violates the conservation of both baryon number and lepton number, however the X charge is conserved. Similarly, all experimentally confirmed forms of decay also conserve the X charge value.

Values of X charge for known elementary particles 
The following table lists the X charge values for the standard model fermions and their antiparticles.

The next table gives the X charge of the standard model bosons.

Although not part of the Standard Model, the GUT X and Y bosons also have zero X charge.

See also 
 Standard Model (mathematical formulation)
 Noether's theorem
 X and Y bosons

Particle physics
Nuclear physics
Standard Model